Cantharellus is a genus of popular edible mushrooms, commonly known as chanterelles, a name which can also refer to the type species, Cantharellus cibarius. They are mycorrhizal fungi, meaning they form symbiotic associations with plants, making them very difficult to cultivate. Caution must be used when identifying chanterelles for consumption due to lookalikes, such as the jack-o'-lantern mushroom (Omphalotus olearius and others), which can make a person very ill. Despite this, chanterelles are one of the most recognized and harvested groups of edible mushrooms.

Many species of chanterelles contain antioxidant carotenoids, such as beta-carotene in C. cibarius and C. minor, and canthaxanthin in C. cinnabarinus and C. friesii.  They also contain significant amounts of vitamin D.

The name comes from Greek κάνθαρος, kantharos 'tankard, cup'.

Taxonomy

The genus Cantharellus is large and has a complex taxonomic history.  Index Fungorum lists over 500 scientific names that have been applied to the genus, although the number of currently valid names is less than 100.  In addition to synonymy, many species have been moved into other genera such as Afrocantharellus, Arrhenia, Craterellus, Gomphus, Hygrophoropsis, and Pseudocraterellus.  Molecular phylogenetic analyses are providing new information about relationships between chanterelle populations.  The following are just a few examples of chanterelle species:

Habitat
Cantharellus species are found throughout the world in association with mycorrhizal host plants, including Africa, Europe, Asia, North America, South America, and Australia.

Chanterelles are associated with either conifers or hardwood trees, depending on species.  They are often found with oaks in California, Texas. and Mexico. In Scotland, chanterelles grow in mixed forests of silver birch and Scots pine, especially when the forest has plenty of moist, mossy undergrowth. In Fife they are common under beech. They are usually (but not always) found in the same places as wild blueberries.  In Spain they associate with sweet chestnut. A walk in the woods after rain should prove fruitful from late July through the Autumn.  In the coastal forests of Washington and British Columbia, they are often found in damp, mossy riparian zones in the vicinity of Western hemlock trees.

Culinary use

Chanterelles in general go well with eggs, curry, chicken, pork, fish, beef and veal, can be used as toppings on pizzas, be stewed, marinated, sauteed, or used as filling for stuffed crêpes. Of course these are just examples; chanterelles are versatile and can be added as an ingredient to most dishes.

In European cuisine, chanterelles are often served with venison. A traditional method of preparing these mushrooms is sauteed and then used to make scrambled eggs.

In Polish tradition, chanterelles are used for making creamy sauces that top chicken.

Many mushroom enthusiasts just like chanterelles sauteed in butter, with a pinch of salt, a clove of fresh crushed garlic, and some whipping cream.  This recipe is said to bring out the subtle flavor of the chanterelle without masking it with other aromas.  This recipe has the added benefit of retaining flavor even after being stored frozen.

It is a feature of Viennese cuisine.

Preparation and storage

Since the mushrooms hold a lot of water, they are often prepared using a "dry sauté" method: after cleaning, the mushrooms are sliced and put in a covered pan over high heat with no oil or butter.  The mushrooms then release much of their water, which can be allowed to boil off or be poured off and used as a stock.  Many people often cook the mushrooms with butter because it "sweetens" them.

Chanterelles can also be pickled in brine.  Salted water is brought to a boil and pickling spices such as peppercorns, mustard seeds, and thyme are added.  The mushrooms are then cooked in this solution for 5–10 minutes before being transferred to sterilized bottles along with some of the liquid.  Sliced garlic and dill can be added to the bottles for extra flavor.  The remaining liquid forms an excellent stock for making soup.  When pickled in this way, chanterelles can last from six to twelve months.

Another storage technique is drying. A vacuum process is also practical on large orders. A few hours before final preparation, put dry mushrooms in water which they absorb for returning to nearly original size. Mushrooms can then be used as fresh and will last indefinitely as dry.

Fresh chanterelles can generally be stored up to ten days in a refrigerator.

Similar species

The False Chanterelle (Hygrophoropsis aurantiaca) has finer, more orange gills and a darker cap. It is edible, but typically a culinary disappointment. The very similar Jack O'Lantern mushroom (Omphalotus olearius) and its sister species (Omphalotus olivascens) are very poisonous, though not lethal. They have true gills (unlike chanterelles) which are thinner, have distinct crowns, and generally do not reach up to the edge. Additionally, the Jack-O-Lantern mushroom is bioluminescent and grows on wood – possibly buried – whereas Cantharellus species grow on the ground.  Species in the genera Craterellus, Gomphus, and Polyozellus may also have a somewhat chanterelle-like appearance.

References

External links

 Recipes as of 2003-07-28
 Info on family Cantharellaceae as of 2003-07-28
 NBCI taxonomy Browser as of 2003-07-28

 
Agaricomycetes genera
Edible fungi
Mushroom types